Frost Independent School District is a public school district based in Frost, Texas (USA).

In addition to Frost, the district serves the town of Mertens in Hill County as well as rural areas in western Navarro County. A small portion of southern Ellis County also lies within the district.

Frost ISD has two campuses - Frost High (Grades 7-12) and Frost Elementary (Grades PK-6). The school mascot (appropriate for the school name) is the Polar Bear.

In 2009, the school district was rated "academically acceptable" by the Texas Education Agency.

References

External links
Frost ISD

School districts in Navarro County, Texas
School districts in Hill County, Texas
School districts in Ellis County, Texas